Granite Glacier is located in the US state of Montana.

See also
 List of glaciers in the United States

References

Glaciers of Park County, Montana
Glaciers of Montana